Rhys Mathewson (born 20 June 1988) is a professional Australian darts player who plays in World Darts Federation and Professional Darts Corporation events.

He made his television debut in the 2016 Sydney Darts Masters, where he caused a shock by beating James Wade in a last-leg decider, before losing to Peter Wright in the quarter-finals.

Earlier that year, he won the Russell Stewart Classic, and in 2017, he won two DPA Australian Pro Tour events.

References

External links
Profile and stats on Darts Database

1988 births
Living people
Australian darts players
Sportsmen from Victoria (Australia)
Sportspeople from Melbourne
People from Hoppers Crossing, Victoria